R. R. Kadam is a former Indian cricket umpire. He officiated in four One Day International (ODI) matches between 1986 and 1987.

See also
 List of One Day International cricket umpires

References

Year of birth missing (living people)
Living people
Indian One Day International cricket umpires
Place of birth missing (living people)